Milan Township is one of nineteen townships in DeKalb County, Illinois, USA. As of the 2010 census, its population was 331 and it contained 130 housing units. Milan Township formed from portions of Shabbona Township and Malta Township on February 23, 1858.

Geography

Airports and landing strips
 Diedrich Airport

Demographics

School districts
 DeKalb Community Unit School District 428
 Indian Creek Community Unit District 425

Political districts
 Illinois's 14th congressional district
 State House District 70
 State Senate District 35

References
 
 US Census Bureau 2009 TIGER/Line Shapefiles
 US National Atlas

External links
 City-Data.com
 Illinois State Archives
 Township Officials of Illinois
 DeKalb County Official Site

Townships in DeKalb County, Illinois
1858 establishments in Illinois
Populated places established in 1858
Townships in Illinois